All Men Are Brothers, also known as Seven Soldiers of Kung Fu, is a 1975 Hong Kong wuxia film based on the Chinese classical 14th century novel Water Margin. The film was produced by the Shaw Brothers Studio and directed by Chang Cheh and Wu Ma.

Cast
David Chiang as Yan Qing
Fan Mei-sheng as Li Kui
Chen Kuan-tai as Shi Jin
Wong Chung as Shi Xiu
Danny Lee as Zhang Shun
Wang Kuang-yu as Zhang Qing
Yue Fung as Sun Erniang
Ti Lung as Wu Song
Zhu Mu as Fang La
Tin Ching as Fang Tianding
Tung Lam as Yuan Shang
Jin Bong-jin as Shi Bao
Bolo Yeung as Si Xingfang
Lau Gong as Li Tianrun
Wong Ching as Rebel general Lu
Zhang Yang as Emperor Huizong of Song
Betty Chung as Li Shishi
Ku Feng as Song Jiang
Tetsuro Tamba as Lu Junyi
Chin Feng as Wu Yong
Chen Wo-fu as Xu Ning
Michael Chan as Dong Ping
Lau Dan as Lei Heng
Lei Lung as Qin Ming
Chang Wing-gai as Xie Bao
Lee Wai-hoi as Xie Zhen
Wu Chi-chin as Yang Xiong
Leung Seung-wan as Liu Tang
Lee Yung-git as Ruan Xiaoer
Bruce Tong as Ruan Xiaowu
Wai Gong-sang as Ruan Xiaoqi
Yueh Hua as Lin Chong
Lily Ho as Hu Sanniang
Cheng Lui as Wang Ying
Yeung Chak-lam as Cai Qing
Paul Chun as Hua Rong
Pang Pang as Lu Zhishen
Ho Hon-chau as Chang Meng
Lo Wai as Zhou Tong
Lee Hang as Dai Zong
Woo Wai as Cai Fu

External links
All Men Are Brothers at the Internet Movie Database
All Men Are Brothers at the Hong Kong Movie Database
All Men Are Brothers on Hong Kong Cinemagic

1975 films
Hong Kong martial arts films
Shaw Brothers Studio films
Wuxia films
Films based on Water Margin
Films directed by Chang Cheh
1970s Hong Kong films